Cornelia van der Veer (born Amsterdam, 30 August 1639 - buried there 18 October 1704) was a Dutch poet.  Along with Catharina Questiers and Katharyne Lescailje she was the most successful female Dutch poet of the second half of the 17th century.

References
Profile at the Digital library for Dutch literature

1639 births
1704 deaths
17th-century Dutch poets
Dutch women poets
Writers from Amsterdam
17th-century Dutch women writers
18th-century Dutch women writers